Mikhail Fedorovich Frolenko (November 1848, Stavropol – February 18, 1938, Moscow) was a Russian revolutionary, populist, member of the Executive Committee of the People's Will.

Biography

He was the son of a retired sergeant major. In 1870 he graduated from the Stavropol Gymnasium, then studied at the Petersburg Institute of Technology, from 1871 at the Petrovsky Agricultural Academy in Moscow.

In 1873–1874, Frolenko was a member of the Moscow circle of Tchaikovites, conducted propaganda among the workers, and participated in "going to the people" in the Urals. Since 1874, he was in an illegal situation. Since 1878, a member of the society "Land and Liberty", a participant in the Lipetsk and Voronezh congresses.

With the emergence of "Narodnaya Volya" – a member of its executive committee, a participant in the assassination attempts of Emperor Alexander II in November 1879 near Odessa and March 1, 1881. Arrested on March 17, 1881, in Saint Petersburg. In the Trial of the 20, Frolenko was sentenced to death, replaced by eternal hard labor, which he served in the Alekseevsky ravelin, from 1884, in the Shlisselburg fortress. Released in October 1905.

In 1908–1917, he lived in Gelendzhik under the supervision of the police, collaborated in the magazine "Byloye".

Since 1922 – in Moscow, a member of the Society of Former Political Prisoners and Exiled Settlers and the editorial board of the journal "Hard Labour and Exile".

In 1936, he joined the All-Union Communist Party (b).

He was buried at the Novodevichy Cemetery in Moscow.

Works
Notes of the Seventies – Moscow, 1927 – 339 Pages

Family
Wives:
Tatyana Lebedeva – in 1879–1881;
Anna Pomerantseva (1860–1924) – social activist, doctor, teacher.

Recognition of merit
After the October Revolution, in 1922, a personal pension of 50,000 rubles was assigned, which at that time with monstrous inflation was not a significant amount. After 11 years, there was an increase in pension according to the Decree of the Council of People's Commissars of the Soviet Union:
"The Council of People's Commissars of the Soviet Union decides:
Increase the personal pension to the participants of the terrorist attack on March 1, 1881: Vera Nikolaevna Figner, Anna Vasilyevna Yakimova–Dikovskaya, Mikhail Fedorovich Frolenko, Anna Pavlovna Pribyleva–Korba and Fani Abramovna Moreynis–Muratova – up to 400 rubles a month from January 1, 1933.
February 8, 1933, Moscow, the Kremlin".

References

1848 births
1938 deaths
Narodnaya Volya
Communist Party of the Soviet Union members
Prisoners of Shlisselburg fortress
Burials at Novodevichy Cemetery